A Beautiful Revolution Pt. 1 is the thirteenth studio album by American rapper Common. It was released on October 30, 2020 through Loma Vista Recordings, making it his second project released for the label. Production was handled by Karriem Riggins, Burniss Travis and Robert Glasper. It features guest appearances from PJ, Black Thought, Chuck D, Jessica Care Moore, Lenny Kravitz, Morgan Parker and Stevie Wonder.

Critical reception

Accolades

Track listing

Charts

References

External links 
 

2020 albums
Common (rapper) albums
Loma Vista Recordings albums
Albums produced by Karriem Riggins